Phitryonus cyanipennis is a species of beetle in the family Cerambycidae, and the only species in the genus Phitryonus. It was described by Fairmaire in 1903.

References

Dorcasominae
Beetles described in 1903
Monotypic beetle genera